Yacha may refer to these towns in China:

Yacha, Guangxi (桠杈), in Longlin Various Nationalities Autonomous County, Guangxi
Yacha, Hainan (牙叉), in Baisha Li Autonomous County, Hainan

See also
Yaksha: Ruthless Operations, a Korean film